Lucerin Blue were a Canadian band who plays Christian rock, post-grunge, nu metal, heavy metal, and hardcore punk from Goderich, Ontario, formed in 1997. They have released one studio album, Tales of the Knife in 2003, with Tooth & Nail Records. The band disbanded in 2005.

Background

Lucerin Blue formed in Goderich, Ontario, Canada, during 1997. Their members are lead vocalist and rhythms guitarist, Justin Morgan, lead guitarist and background vocalist, Nathan Byle, bassist and background vocalist, Paul Rennick, and drummer, Ryan Turner.

Music history
The band began their recording careers in 2003, with the studio album, Tales of the Knife, that was released on May 23, 2003, from Tooth & Nail Records.

Members
 Justin Morgan – lead vocals, rhythm guitar
 Nathan Byle – lead guitar, background vocals
 Paul Rennick – bass guitar, background vocals
 Ryan Turner – drums

Discography
Studio Albums
Tales of the Knife (May 20, 2003, Tooth & Nail)

References

External links

Facebook profile

Canadian Christian rock groups
Tooth & Nail Records artists
Musical groups from Ontario
Musical groups established in 1997
Canadian post-grunge groups